Devara Maga is a 2000 Kannada-language drama film directed by D. Rajendra Babu and written by Mysore Harish. The film stars Shiva Rajkumar and Ambareesh, along with Laila and Bhanupriya in supporting roles. Darshan plays a supporting role in his only movie with Shiva Rajkumar.

The film has an original score and soundtrack composed and written by Hamsalekha. The film was a box office success.

Cast 
 Ambareesh as Raje Gowda
 Shiva Rajkumar as Bharatha
 Bhanupriya as Annapoorna
 Laila as Sowmya
 Srinath as Rajashekhar
 Mukhyamantri Chandru as Sidde Gowda
 Bhavyasri Rai
 Darshan as Darshan
 Tara as Sundari
 Rajashekhara Kadamba
 Junglee Prasanna
 Akki Chennabasappa
 Tulasi

Soundtrack 
The music was composed by Hamsalekha.

References

External links 
 

2000 films
2000s Kannada-language films
Films scored by Hamsalekha
Indian drama films
Films directed by D. Rajendra Babu